Gianiskari (also known as Gialiskari or Dialiskari  is a cluster of three beaches in Greece located 4 km east of Paleochora and 80 km south of Chania city at the easternmost part of the coastline of Palaiochora. Two of the beaches have small pebbles and deep cool waters and the last one is a sandy beach.

References

Beaches of Crete
Landforms of Chania (regional unit)